The University of Sydney Institute of Agriculture is a constituent body of the University of Sydney, Australia. Agriculture was first taught at the University by Australia's first Professor of Agriculture, Robert Dickie Watt, in 1910. According to the University website, the faculty has over 500 members involved in teaching, research and outreach.

References

University of Sydney
Agricultural universities and colleges in Australia